Tachina trianguli is a species of fly in the genus Tachina of the family Tachinidae that is endemic to Venezuela.

References

Insects described in 1849
Diptera of South America
Endemic fauna of Venezuela
trianguli